Çanaqbulaq or Chanakhbulak may refer to:
 Çanaqbulaq, Qabala
 Çanaqbulaq, Yardymli